Star grass is a common name for several plants and may refer to:

Grasses
 Cynodon, a genus of nine species of grasses
 Cynodon dactylon,  a species of grass in the genus Cynodon

Others
 Aletris, a genus of flowering plants in the Nartheciaceae
 Callitriche a genus of flowering plants in the family Nartheciaceae
 Chloris, a genus of flowering plants in the family Nartheciaceae
 Hypoxis, a genus of flowering plants of the family Hypoxidaceae
Rhynchospora colorata, a sedge